Nialamide (Niamid, Niamide, Nuredal, Surgex) is a non-selective, irreversible monoamine oxidase inhibitor (MAOI) of the hydrazine class that was used as an antidepressant. It was withdrawn by Pfizer several decades ago due to the risk of hepatotoxicity.

Side effects include agitation and insomnia, less frequently dry mouth, dizziness, blurred vision, and hypomania, and rarely leukopenia and hepatitis. As with other MAOIs, a hypertensive crisis can be triggered by co-ingestion of tyramine. It is metabolized into isoniazid, an anti-tuberculosis agent, and so is contraindicated in patients with tuberculosis. The recommended dosage range is 75 to 200 mg per day, with maintenance doses as low as 12.5 mg every other day.

The antiatherogenic activity of nialamide was used to design pyridinolcarbamate.

See also 
 Hydrazine (antidepressant)

References 

Hepatotoxins
Monoamine oxidase inhibitors
4-Pyridyl compounds
Hydrazides
Propionamides
Withdrawn drugs